Changewater is an unincorporated community located within Washington Township, in Warren County, New Jersey, United States.

The community was named for its location at the confluence of the upper and lower branches of the river.

Changewater has a post office with ZIP code 07831, which opened on September 26, 1859.

History

One of the early iron furnaces in the county—known as the Changewater Forge—was established here in the mid-1700s by Mark Thomson  and later purchased by a well known local Van Leer family. Ledgers show Samuel Van Leer's sons B. Van Leer and Isaac Van Leer owning the property in the early 1800s.

In 1843, members of a local family—the Castner's—were murdered during an apparent robbery.  The crime attracted widespread publicity, and in 1845, two men were convicted and hanged at the Warren County Court House.

During the 1800s, a number of industries were attempted in Changewater, including a tannery, woolen factory, flouring mill, picture frame factory, snuff factory, and distillery.

In 1874, the village consisted of a looking glass and picture framing factory, a store and post office, a grist mill, and eight residences.

By 1918, Changewater had a population of 200, and the A. T. Skerry woolen mill was its only industry.

References

Washington Township, Warren County, New Jersey
Unincorporated communities in Warren County, New Jersey
Unincorporated communities in New Jersey